The China Center for Energy and Environmental Policy Research, better known as China CEEP, was founded in 2009. It is a Chinese think tank that conducts research on energy economics, climate policy and environmental management. Armed with qualitative and quantitative tools, it aims to provide a scientific basis for public and private decisions in strategy planning and management that are needed to cope with China's increasing demand for energy, as well as the challenges of adapting to and mitigating climate change. China CEEP also serves as a professional education center and a platform for international exchange in the area of energy and environmental policy research.

The current director of China CEEP, Prof. Yi-Ming Wei, established the CAS-CNPC Joint Center for Energy and Environmental Policy in 2006, and held the founding director. The core research team then joined BIT and continued to contribute research, education and international communication in the fields of energy and environmental policy.

Background to its development

The energy problem has already evolved into an important strategic issue due to its influence on human development and the world political and economic situation. Energy systems involve a high degree of complexity, uncertainty and constant change. The coordination of the development of these energy systems along with the economy, society, and environmental regulation is an important part of China's energy economics and energy systems management. At present, it's particularly urgent to carry out energy economics and energy systems management research by establishing a complex, but realistic system model according to related theory, method and technology. Modern mathematical economics (economic mathematics) provides a theoretical basis for energy modeling. Meanwhile, the optimization and overall planning of modern management science also provide method basis for energy modeling. Furthermore, modern computer science and information communication technology form an excellent platform for the model computation.

China CEEP and SCOPE

The Chinese Society of Optimization, Overall Planning and Economic Mathematics (SCOPE) is an academic social group which works directly under the China Association for Science and Technology (CAST). As a top-level Chinese organization, SCOPE plays a pivotal role in the development of China's management science and technology, initiated by the famous mathematician professor Luo-Geng Hua. SCOPE aims to connect scientific workers who take up management science specializing in such fields as optimization, overall planning, economic mathematics, and so on. Many academics in SCOPE have carried out a large number of basic and applied research projects in energy economics and in the management field by energy system modeling and have achieved fruitful research results.

Based on the current research on energy system modeling of SCOPE, the Society of Energy Economics and Management of SCOPE will continue to carry out energy modeling and quantitative research by employing economics mathematics, optimization and overall planning approach, and provides a scientific basis for energy policy. In the world, energy modeling and quantitative analysis have been an important means of energy economics and management research. For instance, to this end, department of management science and engineering, Stanford University has set up the world-famous energy modeling forum. The forum has provided a good scientific research and academic communication platform for those on energy economics and management research for thirty years. To promote the development of domestic energy modeling, the Society of Energy Economics and Management of SCOPE also focus on providing a platform on energy system modeling for domestic energy researchers.

History of its founding

The Chinese Institute of Energy Economics and Management (CIEEM) was formally founded with the approval of the Ministry of Civil Affairs of China on Dec. 18, 2009. It is affiliated with CEEP and the Beijing Institute of Technology.

The 2nd workshop on energy economics & management and funding ceremony of the society of energy economics & management of SCOPE was established in Beijing Institute of Technology on November 20, 2010. More than 100 leaders, experts and scholars attended the conference and they came from more than 50 places, including Research Office of State Council, Energy Research Institute National Development and Reform Commission, Chinese Academy for Environmental Planning, China Association for Science and Technology, SCOPE, Department of Management Science of NSFC, the Chinese Academy of Sciences, the Royal Institute of Technology, Tsinghua University and China National Petroleum Corporation et al., of which there were 28 host from National Natural Science Foundation Project (energy economics and management field).

Prof. Shu-Xing Yang, vice-chancellor of the Beijing Institute of Technology, director Lie-Xun Yang of the Department of Management Science of NSFC, and Prof. Jin-Lin Li, party secretary of the School of Management and Economics, BIT, attended and briefed the conference. Former chairman of SCOPE and former director of Institute of Policy and Management, Chinese Academy of Sciences, Prof. Wei-Xuan, Xu read out the approval document from the Ministry of Civil Affairs.

Former director of Energy Research Institute National Development and Reform Commission and vice director of National energy experts consultation committee, Prof. Da-Di Zhou, Vice Dean of the Chinese Academy for Environmental Planning, Prof. Jin-Nan Wang and director of Department of Management Science of NSFC, Prof. Lie-Xun Yang made presentations titled "China's Energy Strategy" and "'12 5' Energy Development", coal consumption amount control under the restriction of the environment and NSFC funded economic management and energy policy respectively. Supported by the second batch of The Recruitment Program of Global Experts and as the editor of Applied Energy, a world-famous academic periodical in energy field, Prof. Jerry Jinyue Yan from the Royal Institute of Technology introduced the Applied Energy and the preparatory work of International Conference of Applied Energy in May 2011.

Chinese Institute of Energy Economics and Management (CIEEM) of SCOPE was formally approved by Ministry of Civil Affairs of the People's Republic of China and founded on Dec. 18, 2009. CIEEM is attached in the CEEP-BIT. The conference is organized by CIEEM and operated by CEEP-BIT, School of Management and Economics, Chinese Committee for Energy Economics and Department of Management Science of NSFC. Moreover, the conference was supported by Xi'an University of Science and Technology, Tsinghua University, Xiangsu university, Nanjing University of Aeronautics and Astro, China University of Mining and North China Electric Power University and so on.

The conference elected members of the first board of Chinese Institute of Energy Economics and Management of SCOPE. Prof. Yi-Ming Wei, director of CEEP-BIT and Vice President of SCOPE, was elected the President of CIEEM of SCOPE, and Prof. Zhao-Hua Wang, vice director of CEEP-BIT, was the secretary general.

The first session of the council

President: Yi-Ming Wei.
Vice Presidents: Lie-Xun Yang, Li-Xin Tian, Jin-Suo Zhang, Xi-Liang Zhang, and De-Qun Zhou.
Secretary General: Zhao-Hua Wang.
Deputy Secretaries General (alphabetically): Ti-Jun Fan, Ju-Liang Jin, Hua Liao, and Peng Zhou.
Executive directors (alphabetically): Jin Fan, Ti-Jun Fan, Lian-Yong Feng, Ling-Yun He, Li-Ping Jiang, Xiao-Hui Jiang, Jian-Ling Jiao, Ju-Liang Jin, Qiao-Mei Liang, Hua Liao, Lan-Cui Liu, Ru-Yin Long, Chao-Qun Ma, Xiao-Wei Ma, Hong Mi, Xian-Zhong Mu, Rui Nie, Dong-Xiao Niu, Wu-Yuan Peng, Shao-Zhou Qi, Zhong-Ying Qi, Dan Shi, Mei Sun, Xian-Chun Tan, Zhong-Fu Tan, Bao-Jun Tang, Li-Xin Tian, Guang-Cheng Wang, Xue-Rong Wang, Zhao-Hua Wang, Zhen Wang, Yi-Ming Wei, Gang Wu, Qiao-Sheng Wu, Zhi-Jun Yan, Lie-Xun Yang, Jin-Suo Zhang, Xi-Liang Zhang, Yue-Jun Zhang, Guo-Hao Zhao, Xiao-Li Zhao, Yu-Huan Zhao, De-Qun Zhou, Peng Zhou, Ke-Jun Zhu, and Le-Le Zou.
Directors (alphabetically): Xiang-Yun Chang, Rong-Gang Cong, Feng Dong, Jun Dong, Mei Dong, Jin Fan, Ti-Jun Fan, Hong Fang, Lian-Yong Feng, Shi-Kui Gao, Shi-Long Ge, Qing-Fang Guo, Juan Guo, Ling-Yun He, Yong-Xiu He, Ning-Yan Huang, Li-Ping Jiang, Shu-Min Jiang, Xiao-Hui Jiang, Jian-Ling Jiao, Ju-Liang Jin, Bo Li, Xing-Mei Li, Zhong-Min Li, Da-Peng Li, Qiang Liang, Qiao-Mei Liang, Hua Liao, Da Liu, Lan-Cui Liu, Yue Liu, Ya-Qin Liu, Ru-Yin Long, Chao-Qun Ma, Xiao-Wei Ma, Hong Mi, Xian-Zhong Mu, Rui Nie, Dong-Xiao Niu, Wu-Yuan Peng, Shao-Zhou Qi, Zhong-Ying Qi, Han Qiao, Lun Ran, Dan Shi, Mei Sun, Rui Sun, Ze-Sheng Sun, Xian-Chun Tan, Zhong-Fu Tan, Bao-Jun Tang, Li-Xin Tian, Guang-Cheng Wang, Hai-Bo Wang, Kai Wang, Xi-Lian Wang, Xian-En Wang, Xian Wang, Xue-Rong Wang, Yu Wang, Zhao-Hua Wang, Zhen Wang, Yi-Ming Wei, Gang Wu, Qiao-Sheng Wu, Wen-Dong Wu, Xiang-Yang Xu, Zhi-Jun Yan, Hong-Lin Yang, Li Yang, Lie-Xun Yang, Tong Yang, Shi-Wei Yu, Ting Yue, Zheng-Mao Zhan, Bao-Sheng Zhang, Jin-Suo Zhang, Lei Zhang, Li-Bo Zhang, Ming-Hui Zhang, Qin Zhang, Xi-Liang Zhang, Yu Zhang, Yue-Jun Zhang, Ya-Nan Zhang, Guo-Hao Zhao, Jing Zhao, Xiao-Li Zhao, Yu-Huan Zhao, De-Qun Zhou, Peng Zhou, Zhong-Bao Zhou, Bang-Zhu Zhu, Ke-Jun Zhu, Le-Le Zou, and Shao-Hui Zou.

The Main International Academic Cooperation Institutes

China CEEP has established close academic cooperation and exchange with a number of famous international research institutes, such as Harvard University, Massachusetts Institute of Technology, International Energy Agency, University of Cambridge, Chalmers University of Technology, Kyoto University, Cornell University, East-West Center and Santa Fe Institute.

Academic committee
 Chairman: He Jiankun (professor and former executive vice president of Tsinghua University, vice chairman of the National Climate Change Expert Committee)
 Vice Chairmen: Peng Suping (professor of the China University of Mining and Technology, academician of CAE and member of National Energy Expert Advisory Committee), Yu Jingyuan (professor and former director of 710 Research Institute in China Aerospace Science and Technology Corporation), Xu Weixuan (professor and former director of Institute of Policy and Management, Chinese Academy of Sciences )
 Academic Committee experts: Cai Chen (professor and former vice director of Institute of Policy and Management, Chinese Academy of Sciences), Chen Xiaotian (professor and former executive vice director of Department of Management science, National Natural Science Foundation of China), Dai Yande (professor and former vice director of Energy Research Institute, National Development and Reform Commission), Fu Xiaofeng (professor and director of division of Department of Basic Research, Ministry of Science and Technology), Ge Zhengxiang (professor and director of Department of Technology, State Grid), Gu Jifa (professor and former vice director of Academy of Mathematics and Systems Science, Chinese Academy of Sciences), Guo Risheng (professor and director of Administrative Center for China's Agenda 21, Ministry of Science and Technology), Han Botang (Professor of School of Management and Economics, BIT), He Jiankun (prof. and former executive vice president of Tsinghua University, Vice Chairman of National Climate Change Expert Committee), Li Jinlin (prof. and secretary-general of School of Management and Economics, BIT), Li Jingming (professor and chief geologist of Petro China Coalbed Methane Limited Company), Li Shantong (professor and former director of development strategy and regional economic, Development Research Center of the State Council), Li Yijun (professor and executive vice director of Department of Management science, National Natural Science Foundation Committee), Liu Keyu (professor and associate dean of CNPC Economics & Technology Research Institute), Peng Suping (Professor of China University of Mining and Technology, Academician of CAE and member of National Energy Expert Advisory Committee), Sun Hong (professor and director of China Science and Technology Exchange Centre), Wang Shouyang (professor and vice director of Academy of Mathematics and Systems Science, Chinese Academy of Sciences), Wang Huiwen (professor and dean of School of Economics and Management, Beihang University), Wang Jinnan (professor, associate dean & chief engineer of Chinese Academy for Environmental Planning, Ministry of Environment Protection), Wang Siqiang (professor and vice director of Comprehensive Department of the National Energy Bureau), Wang Zhaohua (professor and associate dean of School of Management and Economics, BIT ), Yi-Ming Wei (professor and dean of School of Management and Economics, BIT and the Cheung Kong Scholar Chair Professor), Xu Weixuan (professor and former director of Institute of Policy and Management, Chinese Academy of Sciences ), Yu Jingyuan (professor and former director of 710 Research Institute in China Aerospace Science and Technology Corporation), Yu Wei (director of Department of Energy Conservation and Resources Utilization, Ministry of Industry and Information Technology), Zhou Shaoping (professor and director of Bureau of Science and Technology for Resources and Environment, Chinese Academy of Sciences)
Overseas consulting experts: Beng Wah Ang (National University of Singapore, Singapore), Bert Hofman (World Bank), Chris Nielsen (Harvard University, USA), Eric Martinot (Institute for Sustainable Energy Policies, Japan), Francois Nguyen (International Energy Agency), Henry Jacoby (Massachusetts Institute of Technology, USA), Hirokazu Tatano (Kyoto University, Japan), Iain MacGill (University of New South Wales, Australia), Jinyue Yan (Royal Institute of Technology, Sweden), John Parsons (Massachusetts Institute of Technology, USA), Keith Burnard (International Energy Agency), Norio Okada (Kyoto University, Japan), Ottmar Edenhofer (Technical University Berlin, Germany), Richard S.J. Tol (VU University Amsterdam, Netherland), Tad S Murty (University of Ottawa, Canada), Thomas E. Drennen (Hobart and William Smith Colleges, USA), Bo Yunchang (Chinese Culture University, Taiwan, China), Lin Shimo (Chung Yuan Christian University, Taiwan, China)

Framework
Director： Yi-Ming Wei (Cheung Kong Scholar Chair Professor, Winner of the National Science Fund for Distinguished Young Scholars by NSFC)
 Deputy directors： Zhao-Hua Wang Professor of Program for New Century Excellent Talents in University, professor of the School of Management and Economics, Hua Liao (Excellent Young Scientist Foundation of NSFC, Professor), and Bao-Jun Tang (professor)

Research institutes in China